Earl of Bradford is a title that has been created twice, once in the Peerage of England and once in the Peerage of the United Kingdom. It was first created in 1694 for Francis Newport, 2nd Baron Newport. However, all the Newport titles became extinct on the death of the fourth Earl in 1762. The earldom was revived in 1815 for Orlando Bridgeman, 2nd Baron Bradford. The Bridgeman family had previously succeeded to the Newport estates. The title of the peerage refers to the ancient hundred of Bradford in Shropshire, and not, as might be assumed, to the city of Bradford, Yorkshire, or the town of Bradford-on-Avon in Wiltshire.

History of the title

Newport creation

The Newports were an ancient Shropshire family. One member of the family, Richard Newport, represented Shropshire and Shrewsbury in Parliament and was a supporter of King Charles I during the Civil War. In 1642 he was raised to the Peerage of England as Baron Newport, of High Ercall in the County of Shropshire. His son Francis, the second Baron, represented Shrewsbury in the Long Parliament and fought as a Royalist in the Civil War. After the Restoration he served as Lord Lieutenant of Shropshire, as Comptroller of the Household and as Treasurer of the Household. In 1676 Newport was created Viscount Newport, of Bradford in the County of Shropshire, and on 11 May 1694 he was further honoured when he was made Earl of Bradford, in the County of Shropshire. Both titles were in the Peerage of England.

Lord Bradford was succeeded by his eldest son, the second Earl. He sat as a Whig Member of Parliament for Shropshire and served as Lord Lieutenant of Shropshire. In 1681 Lord Bradford married Mary Wilbraham, daughter of Sir Thomas Wilbraham, Bt, and Elizabeth Mytton. Through this marriage Weston Park in Staffordshire came into the Newport family. Their eldest son, the third Earl, represented Bishop's Castle and Shropshire in the House of Commons and was also Lord Lieutenant of Staffordshire. He had no legitimate children and on his death the peerages passed to his younger brother, the fourth Earl. When he died in 1762 all the Newport titles became extinct. The family estates, including Weston Park, were inherited by his nephew, Sir Henry Bridgeman, 5th Baronet, of Great Lever (see below).

The Hon. Thomas Newport, younger son of the first Earl, was created Baron Torrington in 1716.

Bridgeman creation

The Bridgeman family originally stems from Devon. One member of the family, John Bridgeman, grandson of Edward Bridgeman, served as Bishop of Chester from 1619 to 1652. His son, Orlando Bridgeman, was a prominent lawyer and politician. In 1660 he was created a baronet, of Great Lever in the County of Lancaster, in the Baronetage of England. His great-grandson, the fourth Baronet, represented Shrewsbury in Parliament. In 1719 he married Lady Anne Newport, daughter of Richard Newport, 2nd Earl of Bradford. Their son, the fifth Baronet, was a Member of Parliament for Ludlow and Wenlock for over forty years. In 1762 he succeeded through his mother to the Newport estates, including Weston Park, on the death of his uncle, the fourth Earl of Bradford (see above). After Bridgeman's retirement from the House of Commons in 1794, the Bradford title held by his mother's family was revived when he was raised to the peerage as Baron Bradford, of Bradford in the County of Shropshire.

His son, the second Baron, represented Wigan in Parliament. In 1815, the earldom of Bradford was revived when he was created Viscount Newport, in the County of Shropshire, and Earl of Bradford, in the County of Shropshire. His grandson, the third Earl, was a Conservative politician and notably served as Lord Steward of the Household and as Master of the Horse. He was also Lord Lieutenant of Shropshire. His eldest son, the fourth Earl, represented North Shropshire in Parliament as a Conservative. He was succeeded by his eldest son, the fifth Earl. He was a Lieutenant-Colonel in the army and fought in the Boer War and in the First World War. Lord Bradford was also Private Secretary to both Prime Minister Lord Salisbury and to Prime Minister Arthur Balfour and held office as a Government Whip in the House of Lords from 1919 to 1924. The present holder of the titles is his grandson, the seventh Earl, who succeeded in 1981.

Another member of the Bridgeman family was the Conservative politician William Bridgeman, 1st Viscount Bridgeman. He was the son of Reverend the Hon. John Robert Orlando Bridgeman, third son of the second Earl of Bradford.

Family seats
The family seat is Weston Park in Staffordshire. They also held Castle Bromwich Hall, a manor in Warwickshire, along with the adjoining Castle Bromwich Hall Gardens. The Hall is now a hotel, and its gardens have been restored by a Trust and are open to the public.

Weston Park was held by the family until 1986. Gerald, the 6th Earl of Bradford, who had succeeded to the title in 1957, died in 1981, leaving the family with large death duties. After five years of negotiations with the Treasury, Weston Park was donated to the nation via a Foundation established in 1986.

Since then, a G8 Summit Retreat was held at Weston Park in 1998 with the heads of State or Government present including US President Bill Clinton and Russian President Boris Yeltsin and, since 1999, the grounds of Weston Park have been used as one of the sites of the annual dual-site Virgin sponsored V Festival. While the family of the 7th Earl of Bradford has no remaining claim to Weston Park, much of the artwork (including works by van Dyck and others) remains privately held.

Earl of Bradford, first creation

Baron Newport (1642)
Richard Newport, 1st Baron Newport (1587–1651)
Francis Newport, 2nd Baron Newport (1620–1708) (created Viscount Newport in 1675)

Viscount Newport (1675)
Francis Newport, 1st Viscount Newport (1620–1708) (created Earl of Bradford in 1694)

Earl of Bradford (1694)
Francis Newport, 1st Earl of Bradford (1620–1708)
Richard Newport, 2nd Earl of Bradford (1644–1723)
Henry Newport, 3rd Earl of Bradford (1684–1734)
Thomas Newport, 4th Earl of Bradford (c. 1696 – 1762)

Male-line family tree

Earl of Bradford, second creation

Bridgeman baronets, of Great Lever (1660)
Sir Orlando Bridgeman, 1st Baronet (30 January 1606 – 25 June 1674), son of John Bridgeman, Bishop of Chester.
Sir John Bridgeman, 2nd Baronet (16 August 1631 – 24 August 1710). Bridgeman was the son of the Lord Keeper of the Great Seal Sir Orlando Bridgeman, 1st Baronet, of Great Lever, and Judith Kynaston, and older brother of Sir Orlando Bridgeman, 1st Baronet, of Ridley, he was admitted to the Inner Temple in 1647 and called to the Bar in 1654, though given his father's expression of regret in his will that none of his sons followed him into the legal profession, one must infer that he never practiced.  John succeeded to his father's baronetcy on 25 June 1674. He was married to Mary Cradock, daughter of George Cradock of Caverswall Castle. They had two children: Orlando Bridgeman, married Katherine Bridgeman, daughter of William Bridgeman; Sir John Bridgeman, 3rd Baronet. Bridgeman died, aged 79, in Castle Bromwich, Warwickshire, and was buried in Aston.

Sir John Bridgeman, 3rd Baronet (9 August 1667 – 21 July 1747). Bridgeman was the second son of Sir John Bridgeman, 2nd Baronet, and Mary Cradock, and was educated at Oriel College, Oxford. In 1689, he was called to the Bar, Inner Temple. On 24 January 1710, Bridgeman succeeded in his father's baronetcy. He married Ursula Matthews, daughter of Roger Matthews, in 1694. They had two children: Sir Orlando Bridgeman, 4th Baronet; Ursula Bridgeman, married Hugh Williams. Bridgeman died, aged 79, and was buried in Llanyblodwel, Shropshire.
Sir Orlando Bridgeman, 4th Baronet (2 July 1695 – 25 July 1764). Married Lady Anne Newport, third daughter of the 2nd Earl of Bradford (of the first creation, see above).
Sir Henry Bridgeman, 5th Baronet (7 September 1725 – 5 June 1800) (created Baron Bradford in 1794).

Baron Bradford (1794)
Henry Bridgeman, 1st Baron Bradford (1725–1800)
Orlando Bridgeman, 2nd Baron Bradford (1762–1825) (created Viscount Newport and Earl of Bradford in 1815)

Earl of Bradford (1815)

Male-line family tree

Line of succession

  Henry Bridgeman, 1st Baron Bradford (1725–1800)
  Orlando Bridgeman, 1st Earl of Bradford (1762–1825)
  George Augustus Frederick Henry Bridgeman, 2nd Earl of Bradford (1789–1865)
  Orlando George Charles Bridgeman, 3rd Earl of Bradford (1819–1898)
  George Cecil Orlando Bridgeman, 4th Earl of Bradford (1845–1915)
  Orlando Bridgeman, 5th Earl of Bradford (1873–1957)
  Gerald Michael Orlando Bridgeman, 6th Earl of Bradford (1911–1981)
  Richard Thomas Orlando Bridgeman, 7th Earl of Bradford (born 1947)
 (1)  Alexander Michael Orlando Bridgeman, Viscount Newport (born 1980)
 (2) Hon. Henry Gerald Orlando Bridgeman (born 1982)
 (3) Hon. Benjamin Thomas Orlando Bridgeman (born 1987)
 (4) Hon. Charles Gerald Orlando Bridgeman (born 1954)
 (5) James Edward Charles Bridgeman (born 1978)
 (6) Robert Gerald Orlando Bridgeman (born 1983)
 (7) Nicholas Francis Orlando Bridgeman (born 1991)
 Lt.Col. Hon. Henry George Orlando Bridgeman (1882–1972)
 Lt.Col. Peter Orlando Ronald Bridgeman (1933–2013)
 (8) Mark George Orlando Bridgeman (born 1968)
 (9) Ned Aidan Orlando Bridgeman (born c. 2000)
 (10) Benedict Bridgeman (born 2005)
 (11) John Henry Orlando Bridgeman (born 1938)
 Brig.Gen. Hon. Francis Charles Bridgeman (1846–1917)
 Reginald Francis Orlando Bridgeman (1884–1968)
 (12) Henry Clive Orlando Bridgeman (born 1946)
 Rev. Hon. George Thomas Orlando Bridgeman (1823–1895)
 Charles George Orlando Bridgeman (1852–1933)
 Roger Orlando Bridgeman (1889–1975)
 Richard Lynedoch Orlando Bridgeman (1931–1982)
 (13) Leopold Orlando Bridgeman (born 1968)
 (14) Constantine Orlando Bridgeman (born 1970)
 (15) Hector Richard Orlando Bridgeman (born 2006)
 (16) Orland Bridgeman (born 2008)
 Rev. Hon. John Robert Orlando Bridgeman (1831–1897)
  William Clive Bridgeman, 1st Viscount Bridgeman (1864–1935)
 Brig. Geoffrey John Orlando Bridgeman (1898–1974)
 (17)  Robin John Bridgeman, 3rd Viscount Bridgeman (born 1930)
 (1, 18) Hon. Luke Robinson Orlando Bridgeman (born 1971)
 (2, 19) Valentine Henry Ralph Orlando Bridgeman (born 1999)
 (3, 20) Felix Bridgeman (born 2002)
 (4, 21) Hon. Esmond Francis Ralph Bridgeman (born 1974)
 (5, 22) Hon. Orlando Henry Geoffrey Bridgeman (born 1983)

See also
Baron Torrington
Viscount Bridgeman
Bridgeman baronets

References

External links

Weston Park
Castle Bromwich Hall Gardens Trust website

Extinct earldoms in the Peerage of England
Earldoms in the Peerage of the United Kingdom
Earl

Noble titles created in 1694
1694 establishments in England
Noble titles created in 1815
1815 establishments in the United Kingdom